The Purity Distilling Company was a chemical firm based in Boston,  Massachusetts specializing in the production of ethanol through the distillation process. It was a subsidiary of United States Industrial Alcohol Company who purchased the company in 1917.

Boston Molasses Disaster

In 1919, one of its largest molasses tanks, which was built in 1915, collapsed at 529 Commercial Street. This led to the Boston Molasses Disaster in the North End neighborhood of Boston. Twenty-one people died, and the cleanup took about 6 months to complete, after which the company was sued and forced to pay over $1 million in settlement claims.

References

External links

Finding Aid to the Albert Ladd Colby Report on the Boston Molasses Tank Explosion, Special Collections, Linderman Library, Lehigh University
January 15: 1919, Molasses Floods Boston Streets from History.com
Jesse Kreitzer's The Great Boston Molasses Flood video (YouTube.com)

Distilleries in Massachusetts
Manufacturing companies based in Boston